Mohamed Ahmed Ghoneim is an Egyptian urologist.

Career
Ghoneim is a graduate of the University of Cairo. He is one of the founders of the Ghoneim Urology and Nephrology Center for Management of Renal and Urological Disorders (a World Health Organization collaborating centre located in Mansoura, Egypt).  He is a member of the International Society of Urology, and a member of both the British and the American Urology Associations.  He is a colleague of Professor Nils Kock, the inventor of the Kock pouch.

Gaza War medical relief effort 
Ghoniem provided medical services to war casualties in Gaza during the Gaza War.

Honors and awards 
Ghoneim is the recipient of the Egyptian National Scientific Award, 2001, and was a nominee for the European Urology Society annual award in 2004.   He was the winner of the SIU-Félix Guyon Medal (2006).  Ghoneim served as annual president of the Endourology Society in 1987.

References

External links 
 Mansura University Personal web Page
https://orcid.org/0000-0003-4329-0346

Living people
Academic staff of Mansoura University
Cairo University alumni
1939 births
Egyptian urologists
People from Mansoura, Egypt
Qasr El Eyni Hospital